The sixth and final season of Nip/Tuck premiered on October 14, 2009 and concluded on March 3, 2010. Though a seventh season was originally set to air in 2011, the remaining nine episodes were merged into the sixth season.

Cast and characters

Main cast 
 Dylan Walsh as Dr. Sean McNamara
 Julian McMahon as Dr. Christian Troy
 John Hensley as Matt McNamara
 Roma Maffia as Liz Cruz
 Kelly Carlson as Kimber Henry
 Joely Richardson as Julia McNamara

Special guest stars

Recurring cast

Episodes

U.S television ratings

Reception 
The sixth season received generally positive reviews from critics, holding a 63% fresh rating on Rotten Tomatoes, the show's lowest-rated season on the site. The site's critic consensus read "Nip/Tuck wisely trains its focus on the relationship between the central duo of Christian and Sean during its final season, but this last hurrah often feels like an afterthought for a series that was left too long on the operating room table." Critic Kevin Carr wrote "Manages to keep things fresh and out-of-the-box ... Just when you think the ideas get old, a new, bizarre cosmetic surgery element is thrown at you." Michael Haigis of Screen Rant wrote, "Even though it may not have the lasting impact of its contemporaries, Nip/Tuck was a bell weather, revealing the true potential of FX." Joe Reid of The Atlantic gave a mixed review, writing "It was pretty much a guarantee that the final season of Nip/Tuck would be an ungainly mess, since that was the trajectory the show had been on since pretty much the beginning. But my oh my did it not disappoint in that respect." 

Many critics, however, argued that by the sixth series the show had run its course and criticized the show's repetitive use of imbued scenes, with People writing "The show was cutting-edge in many ways: the operating-room gore, the tone (cool, chic nastiness) and a willingness – often exasperating, often perversely impressive – to go waaaay over the top. Nip didn't just jump the shark, it pole-vaulted it", whilst Margaret Lyons wrote for Vulture that "Nip/Tuck did not end when it ought to have and instead dragged its sorry bones to L.A., where it crapped away all its story integrity and became both boring and redundant." Cindy White at IGN wrote "It's clear from watching these episodes that the show's better days are behind it. It's actually appropriate that Nip/Tuck should go out this way, considering it frequently explores the uphill struggle to maintain youth and vitality as time marches on."

References

Nip/Tuck
2009 American television seasons
2010 American television seasons